Maliele Vincent Pule (born 10 March 1992) is a South African soccer player who plays for Orlando Pirates and  barely plays for the South Africa.

References

1992 births
Living people
South African soccer players
Association football forwards
Bidvest Wits F.C. players
Orlando Pirates F.C. players
South African Premier Division players
African Warriors F.C. players